Andrius Mažutis (born April 21, 1981) is a retired Lithuanian professional basketball player. Standing at is a 1.80 m (5 ft 11 in), Mažutis used to play as point guard.

References
Eurobasket.com – Andrius Mažutis .

1981 births
Living people
ASK Riga players
BC Donetsk players
BC Neptūnas players
BC Tsmoki-Minsk players
Lithuanian men's basketball players
MBC Mykolaiv players
Samogitian Roman Catholics
People from Mažeikiai
Point guards